is a train station in the city of Shiojiri, Nagano Prefecture, Japan, operated jointly by East Japan Railway Company (JR East), with a freight terminal operated by the Japan Freight Railway Company. It is the operational border between JR East and  Central Japan Railway Company (JR Tōkai) for the Chūō Main Line.

Lines
Shiojiri Station is served by the Chūō Main Line (Chūō East Line), and is 222.1 kilometers from the starting point of the line at Tokyo Station. It is also the terminus of the 27.7 kilometer Okaya – Shiojiri branch line. It is also the terminus for the  Shinonoi Line.

Station layout
The station consists of three ground-level island platforms, connected to the station building by an elevated station building.  The station has a Midori no Madoguchi staffed ticket office.

Platforms

History
Shiojiri Station opened on 15 December 1902, initially as the terminal of a Chuo Line extension from Matsumoto. The station was relocated in 1982, with the old station being converted to a classification yard. With the 1987 privatization of the Japanese National Railways, the station was assigned to the control of the East Japan Railway Company.

Passenger statistics
In fiscal 2015, the station was used by an average of 3,981 passengers daily (boarding passengers only).

Surrounding area
Shiojiri City Hall

References

External links

 JR East Shiojiri Station

Railway stations in Nagano Prefecture
Chūō Main Line
Shinonoi Line
Stations of East Japan Railway Company
Stations of Japan Freight Railway Company
Railway stations in Japan opened in 1902
Shiojiri, Nagano